Botswana is divided into fifty-seven parliamentary constituencies.

List of constituencies

See also
 List of electoral districts by nation
List of current members of the National Assembly of Botswana
https://www.iec.gov.bw/index.php/document-library.html/#useful

References

External links
 Old map of the constituencies (PDF)

 
Botswana
Subdivisions of Botswana
Parliamentary constituencies